Becker is an American sitcom television series that originally aired on CBS from November 2, 1998, to January 28, 2004, broadcasting 129 episodes. Set in the New York City borough of the Bronx, the show starred Ted Danson as John Becker, a misanthropic doctor who operates a small practice and is constantly annoyed by his patients, co-workers, and friends, and practically everything and everybody else in his world. Despite everything, his patients and friends are loyal because Becker genuinely cares about them. The series was produced by Dave Hackel Productions and Industry Entertainment, in association with Paramount Network Television.

Premise
The show revolved around Becker and the things that annoyed him, although the members of the supporting cast also had their moments. The relationships between Becker and Reggie, and, later, Becker and Chris formed the key plots of many episodes. The show tackled more serious issues as well, such as race, homosexuality, transgender identities, addiction, nymphomania, schizophrenia, cerebral AVM, and political correctness.

Episodes

Cast and characters
 Ted Danson as Dr. John Becker: A Harvard Medical School graduate who runs a neighborhood medical practice. He is frequently annoyed by things such as a flickering street lamp, noisy neighbors and rubbish on TV. Becker is pessimistic and superstitious, believing that just about everything brings him bad luck. Always trying to quit smoking, Becker hides a packet of cigarettes in the cash register of the diner where he hangs out to control his intake and keep his habit from Margaret. An atheist, because he can't accept a God who lets bad things happen, he does not rule out the possibility that God is torturing him for his nonbelief. He has been divorced twice and is very stingy. Becker is politically left (especially in later seasons), though he hates political correctness. Despite his gruff nature, Becker exhibits moments of kindness and shows the utmost professionalism in dealing with his patients, accepting gifts from those who can't pay. Initially, the reason why he is working in a run-down neighborhood of the Bronx is a sore point, though he later says he turned down a research job at Johns Hopkins Hospital in Baltimore because the neighborhood is where he's most needed. Danson, whose hair had gone completely white, dyed his hair brown to more closely resemble his appearance as Sam Malone on Cheers, but with a very different, less fashionable style. 
 Hattie Winston as Margaret Wyborn: Becker's nurse and office manager, and one of the few people who can tolerate Becker. Margaret is a motherly figure to Becker and Linda. She is married, at best rockily, to the often mentioned but never-seen "Lewis", who hates Becker (and vice versa). She once thought about becoming a singer instead of a nurse. Margaret is a Christian, specifically a Baptist, and often quotes the Bible. Margaret is generally the most level-headed character and acts as the voice of reason. She also appears to have liberal views; in one episode, she is asked what Florida is known for, and sarcastically answers "not counting votes?", and once chastised Becker for what she perceived as homophobic behavior. She is also shown to be quite stubborn, a prime example being getting her job by not leaving until Becker hired her.
 Shawnee Smith as Linda: A flighty, uneducated young woman who works as Margaret's aide in Becker's office. Becker explains her presence there by saying that he owed her father a favor. Although often inconsiderate and slow on the uptake, Linda sees events from a unique perspective which can be helpful. Although she has a strained relationship with her alcoholic mother, her wealthy parents bought her a luxury penthouse. In season two, she invites Bob to live with her after he becomes homeless and is too polite to kick him out. Linda is popular with some of the patients, due to her skimpy outfits and bubbly personality. She is good with kids and helps Becker out when they need shots. She is always deferential and calls Becker "Doctor" no matter where she is, and stuck up for him after a "sex talk" he gave to a school class didn't go down well. She has a soft spot for small animals and loves to go shopping, clubbing, and dating. She has an on-again/off-again ex-boyfriend Gil. She speaks Portuguese and learned some Mandarin from an ex-boyfriend, which proves useful when dealing with patients.
 Alex Désert as Jake Malinak: Becker's best friend, who runs the newsstand in the diner. Jake lost his sight in a car accident several years prior. He was close to one of his grandmothers who raised him before she died. Jake married a woman called Amanda (played by Lindsay Price), 24 hours after they met. They had the marriage annulled but lived together for some time until Amanda left, taking all his possessions with her. Jake competed three times in the National Scrabble Championship, winning once. In the final episode, Jake decides to spend an inheritance on a college education. He enrolls to study in Chicago, where he can stay with a relative who teaches on campus.
 Terry Farrell as Regina 'Reggie' Kostas (seasons 1–4): The owner and operator of the diner where Becker hangs out. A former model, she moved back home after her career had stalled and her father fell ill. She inherited the diner, along with its grumpy customer Becker, and continues to run it despite all of the complaints about her cooking and her dissatisfaction with her situation. Reggie gets an 'A' in psychology, then has a panic attack thinking about her future after everybody jokes about the uselessness of the degree. Reggie has a love-hate relationship with Becker. At the end of the fourth season, she becomes jealous of all the attention Becker is paying to Chris and kisses Becker. However, as the actress playing Reggie was let go after season 4, in the fifth season's premiere ("Someone's In The Kitchen with Reggie?"), it's explained that Reggie and Becker had slept together, but then Reggie regretted throwing herself at him, regarding it as hitting rock bottom. She rings the diner, and leaves a message with a customer for Jake, explaining that she has gone to Europe with some friends from modelling and is reassessing her life and career.
 Saverio Guerra as Bob (recurring, seasons 1–2; main, seasons 3–5): Bob is an old high school classmate of Reggie's who is short, hyperactive, and annoying. (In episodes 2 and 3 of season 1, James Lorinz played an annoying diner regular named Manny; Bob was essentially a replacement for this character.)  In his earlier appearances, a running gag involved Bob frequently referring to himself in the third person but this is gradually toned down as the show progressed. Bob largely serves as the larger-than-life running gag of the series, bringing levity to many of the serious issues encountered. Bob is a sex addict, who initially continually hits on Reggie, who ignored him in high school, despite being married and Reggie making it abundantly clear that she still detests him. In season two, Bob becomes homeless after his wife cleans him out in a divorce. Linda kindly invites him to stay at her place but is soon trying to find him a job so she can get rid of him. He became a regular character for seasons 3–5 and worked as the lazy superintendent of Becker's building. Bob's middle name is Benito but his surname is never given. One of his few talents is that he is an excellent cook. Guerra did not renew his contract for the shortened season 6. Bob's absence is explained by his going on vacation and he is never mentioned again.
 Nancy Travis as Christine "Chris" Connor (guest, season 4; main, seasons 5–6): Becker's new neighbor who moves to the Bronx after traveling the world. The character was originally intended to be in the show for only four episodes at the end of Season 4, but became a regular cast member in Season 5. Chris takes over the diner and begins a love-hate relationship with Becker. She is his total oppositealways nice and cheerful, but by the end of the series they get together. Travis had previously worked with Danson in Three Men and a Baby and Three Men and a Little Lady.
 Jorge Garcia as Hector Lopez (season 6): The little brother of one of Jake's childhood friends. Jake said that Hector would do anything to make money, including selling his parents' condoms, to which he responded, "Hey, those weren't scams, they were business ventures.  Besides I got a baby sister out of it."  He was a cast member only during the sixth season, serving as a replacement of sorts for Bob. In the last episode, Hector takes over control of the newsstand after Jake announces he will be moving to Chicago for college.

Terry Farrell's departure
Terry Farrell was written out of Star Trek: Deep Space Nine (where she played Jadzia Dax) after her contract expired without renegotiation. Soon after, Farrell got the role of Reggie. According to Farrell, the original plan was for Reggie and Becker to have a relationship with romantic tension over the course of the show; the show's ending would be them going on their first date. However, the producers became worried that this would be compared to Sam and Diane's relationship on Cheers, so they backed away from it.

At the end of season four, Nancy Travis was introduced for a short arc playing Chris, Becker's new neighbor. Chris was a cheerful and optimistic character, the opposite of Becker, and would serve as a rival for Reggie. The season ended with a cliffhanger as Reggie kissed Becker and then left. However, Farrell was dropped at the end of season four, which came as a shock to her. Creator and executive producer David Hackel and Farrell have both stated that it had nothing to do with Farrell supporting the cast in a lawsuit and walkout for a promised pay raise after season three. Hackel said that Chris and Becker's relationship would "shake things up a bit," which the network wanted, and that, instead of having Reggie do the usual thing and return to patch things up, she would just decide to leave.

Syndication
The show was offered in syndication between 2003 and 2004, after its network run on CBS ended. In the U.S., the show aired on WGN America until 2010. ReelzChannel added the show in fall 2010. From January 2017 it is on Antenna TV.
As of 2022 it airs on Pluto TV.

In Australia, Becker was originally broadcast on Network Ten. Reruns of the series have been aired weekdays on Foxtel's pay TV network 111 funny and Network Ten's digital channel 10 Peach.

Home media
CBS DVD (distributed by Paramount)  has released all six seasons of Becker on DVD in Region 1.  Season 4-6 are Manufacture-on-Demand (MOD) releases, available exclusively via Amazon.com's CreateSpace program.

On June 6, 2017, CBS DVD released Becker: The Complete Series on DVD in Region 1.

In Region 2, Paramount Home Entertainment released the first season on DVD on April 28, 2008. There were issues with the discs that meant audio and video were out of sync.

In Region 4, Paramount Home Entertainment released the first three seasons on DVD in 2008/2009.  In 2013, Umbrella Entertainment acquired the rights to the series and subsequently re-released the first three seasons.  Season 4 was released on February 5, 2014.  Season 5 and 6 were released in August 2016.

Reception
Becker debuted as part of CBS' highly rated Monday night lineup as a midseason replacement for the cancelled sitcom The Brian Benben Show, taking over the timeslot at 9:30 PM Eastern time. The show performed well for its first four seasons, piggybacking off the ratings of its lead-in, Everybody Loves Raymond; in its first four seasons, Becker ranked in the top 20 and peaked at #13.

Despite the ratings wins they were getting with the series, CBS decided to try to find a new home for Becker and relocated the sitcom to lead off its Sunday night lineup. The ratings unexpectedly fell as Becker dropped out of the top 50 in the ratings, and CBS was set to cancel the series. The network relented and gave Becker a sixth and last season, but was only willing to order thirteen episodes and intended to air it as a midseason replacement. Once again, the network changed its decision and the last season launched in the fall. Moved to Wednesday nights and aired in tandem with former Monday staple The King of Queens, the 129th and last episode of Becker was aired on January 28, 2004.

Nielsen ratings

See also
 List of Becker episodes

References

External links

 

1998 American television series debuts
2004 American television series endings
1990s American sitcoms
2000s American sitcoms
1990s American medical television series
2000s American medical television series
1990s American workplace comedy television series
2000s American workplace comedy television series
CBS original programming
English-language television shows
Fictional physicians
Television series by CBS Studios
Television shows set in the Bronx